Best of the M.C. Records Years 1999–2005 is a compilation album by American folk singer Odetta, released in 2006. It contains songs she recorded on the M.C. Records label.

Track listing
All songs Traditional unless otherwise noted.
"Blues Everywhere I Go" (Scott Shirley) – 4:53
"Goodnight, Irene" (Lead Belly, Alan Lomax) – 4:58
"Please Send Me Someone to Love" (Percy Mayfield) – 2:34
"This Little Light of Mine" (Harry Loes) – 4:43
"Bourgeois Blues" (Huddie Ledbetter) – 4:33
 "Trouble in Mind" (Big Bill Broonzy) – 4:27
"New Orleans" (Broonzy) – 4:43
"Freedom Trilogy: Oh Freedom/Come & Go with Me/I'm on My Way" – 6:34
 "Two Little Fishes and Five Loaves of Bread" (Bernie Haneghen) – 3:24
"Roberta" (Ledbetter, Lomax) – 5:36
"Can't Afford to Lose My Man" (Ernest Lawlars) – 2:56
"Midnight Special" (Ledbetter) – 4:54
"Poor Little Jesus" – 2:17
"Alabama Bound/Boll Weevil" (Leadbelly, Traditional) – 7:20
"What Month Was Jesus Born In?" – 1:48
"Oh, Papa" (Davide Elman) – 3:01
"You Gotta Know How" (Sippie Wallace) – 3:38

Personnel
Odetta – vocals
Henry Butler – piano
Mark Carpentieri – drums
Richard Crooks – drums
Popsy Dixon – drums
Dr. John – piano, vocals
Seth Farber – piano, organ
Sherman Holmes – bass
Wendell Holmes – guitar, piano
Freddy Koella – violin
Michael Merritt – bass
Shawn Pelton – drums
Pinetop Perkins – piano
Jim Saporito – percussion
Brad Vickers – bass
Jimmy Vivino – guitar (electric, acoustic, and 12-string), banjo
Kim Wilson – harmonica

Production notes
Liner Notes by Alan Robinson

2006 greatest hits albums
Odetta compilation albums